Rainy River is a town in north-western Ontario, Canada, southeast of Lake of the Woods. Rainy River is situated on the eponymous Rainy River, which forms part of the Ontario-Minnesota segment of the Canada–US border. Across the river is the town of Baudette, Minnesota. The two towns are connected by the Baudette – Rainy River International Bridge. Rainy River is at the northwestern terminus of Highway 11.

Rainy River was frequently thought to have been the northwestern terminus of Yonge Street, or Highway 11 running north from Toronto. Because of this incorrect conflation, Yonge Street was known as the "longest street in the world." and gained its fame in the Guinness World Records for many years. Highway 11 is marked through Rainy River as Atwood Avenue, although the town and the City of Toronto both maintain commemorative markers at each end.

History
From Rainy Lake, derived from the French .  Appears as Rain Lake in 1813 Gazetteer. A post office named Rainy River was established in 1886.  Incorporated as the town of Rainy River in 1904, the community was first formed around 1895 as part of mill development by a group of lumbermen along the northeast shore of the Rainy River. Their mill and related developments were located about 2 km from the current town center. In 1898 their mill was purchased by the Beaver Mills Lumber Company. The small village took the name Beaver Mills until it was incorporated as a town. In 1901 the Ontario and Rainy River Railway completed a bridge connecting Minnesota, United States to Ontario, but the Beaver Mills town site was in the way of the eastern end. The company developed a new town further upriver, between the two large lumber mills. The only method of transport at the time was by steamship so parts of the bridge were shipped and arrived addressed to "Rainy River". The town eventually accepted this as their name.

The lumber industry and associated mills stimulated growth of the town, as did the Railway.  In 1910, a forest fire known as the Great Fire of 1910, originating in northern Minnesota, swept north and destroyed the mills.  On the southern, US side of the river, the villages of Baudette and Spooner were destroyed in the fire. Most survivors from the US-side survived because residents from Rainy River backed a train of box cars across the bridge and pulled the people north to safety. After the fire, the mill industry relocated. The population of Rainy River quickly declined from more than 2000 people to less than 800. No alternative economy was developed to support a larger population.

The town of Rainy River pivoted industry to railway and hunting/fishing tourism. But the railroad and the growing hunting/fishing tourism industry have helped the town to survive. At one time it was the site of a rail round house and associated jobs. In the 1960s the Rainy River Boat company operated here, and in the 1970s Arctic Cat Apparel manufactured related clothing. The decline of these industries has affected the rural town.

Demographics 

Government

Federal representation 
The town is in the Canadian electoral district of Thunder Bay—Rainy River, which elects one Member of Parliament (MP) to represent it in Parliament. Don Rusnak, a member of the Liberal Party, was elected in 2015.

City Mayor and Council 
The city is headed by Rainy River Mayor and six elected city councillors.

Notable people
Bronko Nagurski, Hall of fame NFL player
James Arthur Mathieu, businessman and politician
Angela Bulloch, sound and installation artist

See also
The Great Fire of 1910
SS Keenora (river ship)
Ontario and Rainy River Railway

References

External links

Municipalities in Rainy River District
Single-tier municipalities in Ontario
Towns in Ontario